The Santali Wikipedia (Santali: ᱥᱟᱱᱛᱟᱲᱤ ᱣᱤᱠᱤᱯᱤᱰᱤᱭᱟ) is the Santali language version of Wikipedia, run by the Wikimedia Foundation. The site was launched on 2 August 2018. Santali language's own alphabet, Ol Chiki, has been used as the alphabet of this Wikipedia. Santali is a language in the Munda subfamily of Austroasiatic languages, spoken by around 7.4 million people in South Asia (Bangladesh, India, Bhutan and Nepal).

History
The process of creating a Santali-language Wikipedia began in 2012 and, later on, picked up momentum in February 2017.
 Back in 2012, Wikimedia Bangladesh organized a Wikipedia meetup and workshop with the Santali Language Community in Dinajpur District of Bangladesh with the goal of launching a Santali Language Wikipedia. 
However, that process slowed after some time.

Then in September 2017, Wikimedia Bangladesh organized another meeting with the Santali Language Community in a Dhaka Wikipedia meetup where a decision was made to expedite the launch of the Wikipedia.
 Following that discussion, a workshop was organized in Dhaka by Wikimedia Bangladesh for the Santali-language community on 30 December 2017.
 
The Santali-language community from India also participated in that program through online discussion. Subsequently, another workshop was organized for the Santali-language community in Odisha, India, on 11 March 2018 in collaboration with the Odia Wikimedians User Group.

After months of work, the Wikimedia Language Committee approved the Santali-language Wikipedia on 28 June 2018 and the Santali Wikipedia site was finally launched on 2 August 2018.

Users and editors

Gallery

See also
 Bengali Wikipedia
 Hindi Wikipedia
 Tamil Wikipedia
 Telugu Wikipedia

References

External links

 Santali Wikipedia
 Wikipedia.org multilingual portal
 Wikimedia Foundation

Wikipedias by language
Santali language
Internet properties established in 2018
Wikipedia in India